Uri Simonsohn is a behavioral scientist at ESADE business school in Ramon Llull University in Barcelona, Spain, and a Senior Fellow at the Wharton School of the University of Pennsylvania. His substantive interest is in Judgment and Decision Making, and he is also a methodologist. 

He is originally from Chile. He earned his undergraduate degree in economics from Universidad Católica de Chile, and his PhD at Carnegie Mellon University in Social and Decision Sciences in 2003, and became a professor of Operations Management at the Wharton School where he stayed until 2017, leaving to move to ESADE Business School in Barcelona as a full professor.

He has been involved in research on false-positives, p-hacking, experimental replication, and pre-registrations of research. He has contributed to identifying various cases of scientific fraud including the work of Dirk Smeesters and Lawrence Sanna.

References

Year of birth missing (living people)
Living people
University of Pennsylvania faculty
Social psychologists
Academic staff of ESADE
Carnegie Mellon University alumni